Louise Chabot  is a Canadian politician who was elected to represent the riding of Thérèse-De Blainville in the 2019 Canadian federal election as a member of the Bloc Québécois.  She was re-elected in the 2021 election.

Electoral Record

References

External links

Bloc Québécois MPs
Members of the House of Commons of Canada from Quebec
Women members of the House of Commons of Canada
21st-century Canadian politicians
21st-century Canadian women politicians
Living people
Year of birth missing (living people)
People from Mauricie